The following is a list of episodes of The Lucy Show, an American sitcom television series that ran on CBS from October 1, 1962 to March 11, 1968.  The 30 half-hour season one episodes were all shot in black-and-white; all the remaining 126 half-episodes (from season two onwards) were shot in color.

Series overview

Episodes

Season 1 (1962–63)
All episodes in black-and-white

Season 2 (1963–64)
All episodes (Season 2 and onwards) in color

Season 3 (1964–65)

Season 4 (1965–66)

Season 5 (1966–67)

Season 6 (1967–68)

See also
List of Here's Lucy episodes

Notes

References

Lucy Show

fr:L'Extravagante Lucie
nl:The Lucy Show
ja:ザ・ルーシー・ショー
sh:The Lucy Show
fi:The Lucy Show
sv:Lucy Show